"Beat Control" is a digital EP by indie pop group Tilly and the Wall, and the name of its title track. The EP was released via Team Love Records to online music stores on March 4, 2008. A limited edition 7" vinyl was also released. "Beat Control" is not on the band's third album o, but "Cacophony" is. The EP debuted on the UK Singles Chart at #153.

Music video
The music video for "Beat Control" premiered on February 25. The band perform in fluorescent clothing with a neon glow surrounding them, against patterned backgrounds.

Track listing
Digital EP: 
 "Beat Control" – 2:53
 "Cacophony" – 2:27
 "L3t Teh B34t C0ns013 Yov" (Pewep Merix) – 3:24
7" Vinyl:
 "Beat Control" – 2:53
 "L3t Teh B34t C0ns013 Yov" (Pewep Merix) – 3:24
CD single:
 "Beat Control" – 2:47
 "Too Excited" – 3:18

References

External links
Tilly and the Wall official website
Tilly and the Wall on MySpace
Team Love Records

2008 EPs
Tilly and the Wall albums